The 39th Arkansas Infantry Regiment or Cocke's Arkansas Infantry Regiment (also known as "Johnson's regiment," "Hawthorn's regiment," "Cocke's regiment," or "Polk's regiment") was an infantry formation of the Confederate States Army during the American Civil War, and was successively commanded by Colonels Albert W. Johnson, Alexander T. Hawthorn, John B. Cocke, and Lieutenant-Colonel Cadwallader Polk.

The regiment was mustered into service on June 17, 1862, at Trenton, Arkansas, remaining active through May 26, 1865. When Major-General Thomas C. Hindman began authorizing the creation of new infantry regiments within the Trans-Mississippi Department in the summer of 1862, he initially designated them as "Trans-Mississippi Rifle Regiments", and the new regiment being formed by Albert W. Johnson was designated as the 6th Trans-Mississippi Rifle Regiment. Another state regiment was also designated 39th Arkansas Infantry; that being successively commanded by Colonels Hart, McNeill, and Rogan. It was originally designated as the 39th Arkansas Infantry Regiment, but later redesignated as the 30th. The regiment served in the Trans-Mississippi Theater and participated in all of the principal engagements in the Trans-Mississippi Department before being disbanded on May 26, 1865.

Organization
The 39th (Johnson's) Arkansas Infantry Regiment was organized in 1862 at Trenton, Arkansas. Hindman assumed command of the Trans-Mississippi Department on May 30, 1862, and immediately began attempting to organize the Confederate forces in Arkansas. On June 15, 1862, Colonel Robert C. Newton, Hindman's Adjutant-General, wrote to Colonel Albert W. Johnson who was attempting to raise a regiment in Phillips County, Arkansas:

In mid-July 1862, several companies, including a small battalion under Captain Daniel H. Ringo, were added to Colonel Johnson's regiment. Ringo was appointed Lieutenant-Colonel of the Regiment on July 19, 1862. By August 12, 1862, the new regiment was at Crystal Hill, north of Little Rock. Johnson received his official appointment as Colonel on August 15, with date of rank from June 8, 1862. In September and October, the regiment camped at Austin, Arkansas, and Des Arc. Johnson resigned on October 27 in order to report to Major-General John C. Breckinridge, East of the Mississippi River. Lieutenant-Colonel Ringo resigned the following day. In accepting their resignations, Hindman noted that the two men were not in good standing with the officers of the regiment. On November 3, 1862, Hindman issued Special Order Number 30:

The regiment consisted of the following companies:

 Company A – commanded by Captain Pleasant Roper, enlisted at Trenton, Phillips County, on Organized at Big Creek, (a.k.a. Trenton) in Phillips County, June 4, 1862.
 Company B – Commanded by Captain John B. Torbett, organized at Rockport in Hot Spring County (present-day Garland County), July 4, 1862;
 Company C – Commanded by Captain J. W. Scaife, consisting of men from Monroe County, enlisted June 12, 1862; 
 Company D – Commanded by Captain Walton Watkins, organized at Benton, Saline County, June 17, 1862;
 Company E – commanded by Captain W.J.F. Jones, organized in Monroe County, June 14, 1862; 
 Company F – commanded by Captain J. H. Boring, organized in Perry County, August 1, 1862; 
 Company G – commanded by Captain Felix Strayhorn, organized in Yell County; 
 Company H – original commander is unknown but the company was organized in Phillips County.
 Company I – commanded by Captain George Washington, organized in Hot Spring County. 
 Company K – commanded by Captain George Harrod, organized at Danville, Yell County, July 21, 1862; 
 Company L – commanded by Captain Joel C. Anderson, organized in Green County.

The regiment served in McRae's, Fagan's, and Hawthorn's Brigade, Trans-Mississippi Department. The field officers were Colonels Albert W. Johnson, A. T. Hawthorn, John B. Cocke, and Cadwallader Polk, and Lieutenant-Colonel D. W. Ringo.

Confusion over naming

The regiment's designation has caused problems for historians attempting to research the unit. Although Colonel John B. Cocke commanded "Cocke's Regiment" for only three months, and the historically accurate designation should be "39th (Johnson's-Hawthorn's-Cocke's) Infantry Regiment or the 6th Trans-Mississippi Rifle Regiment, and Hailey's, Perkins' and Tumlinson's independent cavalry companies, historians have adopted "Cocke's Arkansas Regiment.""  This is because the U.S. government used the name to catalog the service records of the men who served in the regiment. In the early 1900s, an army of U.S. War Department clerks pored over hundreds of thousands of Confederate army records, muster rolls, payrolls, quartermaster and commissary receipts, prisoner of war records, etc., and painstakingly extracted individual information from them to create a Compiled Service Record for each Confederate soldier. This monumental task is one of the most valuable services the federal government performed for researchers. However, the clerks misread many names and also worked with sometimes confusing records, cataloguing everything about this unit under "Cocke's Regiment".

The regiment is officially referred to by the U.S. National Archives and Records Administration as "Cocke's Arkansas Infantry Regiment," even though John B. Cocke was the last known colonel of the regiment, serving from January 1864 until April, when he was killed at the Battle of Jenkins' Ferry. He was preceded in command by Albert W. Johnson, and Alexander T. Hawthorn. Cadwallader Polk assumed command upon Cocke's death, but there is no surviving record to show he was promoted to colonel. The Trans-Mississippi Department frequently used the name of the regimental commander in its official correspondence, especially for Arkansas regiments. The order of battle for the Battle of Helena lists a "39th Arkansas Infantry Regiment" in McRae's brigade, but this was actually Hart's 30th Arkansas Regiment, which was known for a short time as the 39th Arkansas. Hart's regiment was with McRae, and the real 39th Regiment was in Brig. Gen. Fagan's brigade and is referred to in the battle reports as "Hawthorn's Regiment".

The Arkansas State Military Board was responsible for authorizing, raising and designating Arkansas regiments, in response to requests from the Confederate States War Department for new units. The board took a sheet of lined paper, numbering the lines from 1 to 48, and applied the next available number to each new regiment. Unfortunately, the Confederate States War Department, the Trans-Mississippi Department, the brigade commanders, and even the regimental commanders often used designations different from the State Military Board's.

The State Military Board designated the regiment as "Cocke's Regiment" as 39th in its ledger book. Hindman originally decided to designate all of the Arkansas infantry regiments raised in the District of Arkansas during the summer of 1862 as "Trans-Mississippi Rifle Regiments." Cocke's Regiment was designated as the 6th Trans-Mississippi Rifle Regiment; and, the officers and men of Cocke's Regiment quickly began referring to the regiment as the 6th Arkansas. This redesignation causes more confusion because this designation had already been given to Lyon's-Hawthorn's-Smith's elite 6th Arkansas Infantry Regiment in the Army of Tennessee, on the east side of the Mississippi River. This incorrect association with the other 6th Arkansas Infantry is further reinforced by the fact that Alexander T. Hawthorn commanded the original "6th Arkansas Infantry Regiment" for a time, and later commanded the "other" 6th Arkansas, the 6th Trans-Mississippi (39th Arkansas Infantry Regiment).

Service

Prairie Grove Campaign
On November 15, 1862, Hindman moved the Arkansas infantry regiments to Massard Prairie, three miles southeast of Fort Smith to drill and organize divisions. The 39th Arkansas was assigned to the 1st (Fagan's) Brigade of 2d (Shoup's) Division, of 1st (Hindman's) Corps of Holmes's Army of the Trans-Mississippi.  The unit was brigaded with the 34th Arkansas Infantry Regiment commanded by Colonel William H. Brooks, the 35th Arkansas Infantry Regiment, commanded by Colonel James P. King, the 37th Arkansas Infantry Regiment, commanded by Colonel Joseph C. Pleasants and Chew's Arkansas Infantry Battalion, commanded by Major Robert E. Chew .

At the very end of November the cavalry was sent north toward Washington County. Early in December the infantry followed heading north. The brigade crossed the Arkansas River on December 2, 1862. On December 4, the column reached Oliver's Store on Lee creek in the Boston Mountains. There battle flags were presented to the regiments of the division.

Battle of Prairie Grove
On December 6, 1862 Fagan's brigade arrived at Morrow's and controlled the approaches to Cane Hill from the south and east. Hindman then learned of the approach of General Herron, who had two divisions just north of Fayetteville. Hindman planned to get behind the Federal division of General Blunt and prevent General Herron's division from combining with Gen. Blunt. Upon reaching the high ground at Prairie Grove on December 7, Hindman's army formed on the ridge overlooking Crawford Prairie and Fagan's brigade was advanced to a position fifty yards from the Borden Orchard.  The position was very good and there the army waited for Herron to advance. Brook's regiment was posted behind an artillery battery.  Around 2:00 pm the artillery duel started. Blocher's Battery, which was part of Fagan's brigade became a lightning rod for Federal artillery and later infantry. The 20th Wisconsin advanced to take the battery and when their right flank was 50 yards away from their position, Brook's 34th Arkansas rose and fired into them. The regiment was ordered forward along with Chew's Arkansas Infantry Battalion and Hawthorne's regiment. The 20th Wisconsin was driven back and the battery was retaken. As the Confederate counterattack came off the ridge and onto the prairie they came under heavy fire and retreated to their position in the ravine. As the Confederates were reorganizing another Federal attack was launched. This time the 37th Illinois advanced to the summit. Again the Fagan's brigade rose out of the scrub and fired a point blank volley and charged. The two forces locked in hand-to-hand fighting. Again the Confederates followed the retreating Federals and ran into heavy fire. As the brigade resumed their position on the summit, the tempo of the battle slowed and shifted to another part of the battlefield. They stayed in position until nearly midnight when the order to retreat came. During the march over the Boston Mountains many of the men deserted to their homes.

On December 1, 1862, Brig. Gen. James F. Fagan asked for the consolidation of Chew's Arkansas Infantry Battalion and the 39th (Hawthorn's) Arkansas Infantry Regiment, both of his brigade. While this order was not approved until after the Battle of Prairie Grove, the battalion and the 39th (Hawthorn's) Arkansas Infantry Regiment fought side by side during the battle. They took part in the charges of Fagan's Brigade driving back the 20th Wisconsin, 19th Iowa, and 37th Illinois and 26th Indiana regiments when these Union troops ascended the ridge.

Re-Organization and Consolidation with Chew's Sharpshooter Battalion
After the retreat from Prairie Grove to Van Buren, the 39th (Hawthorn's) Regiment Arkansas Infantry Regiment underwent a major reorganization on December 16, 1862. Hailey's, Perkins' and Tumlinson's cavalry companies had been dismounted and organized into Chew's Sharpshooter Battalion prior to the battle of Prairie Grove, and, in the general reorganization of the Confederate army after the battle, the companies were consolidated with Hawthorn's Regiment. The U.S. War Department clerks who created the Compiled Service Records combined all the service records of these cavalrymen into "Cocke's regiment", rather than catalog them as independent companies. The problem is that many of the men who served in those companies were not around when the companies were consolidated with Cocke's regiment.

 Company A, Commanded by Captain Pleasant Roper, 
 Company B, Commanded by Captain J.H. Borning, organized by consolidation of old Company F and old Company G,   
 Company C, Commanded by Captain Richard Davis, organized by consolidated of old Company C and old Company I,   
 Company D, Commanded by Captain Walton Watkins,
 Company E, Commanded by Captain W.J.F. Jones, organized by consolidation of old company E and Company L,
 Company F, Commanded by Captain George Harrod, formerly old Company K. 
 Company G, Commanded by Captain Elbert Dawson. This company had previously been assigned as Company A, Chew's Sharpshooter Battalion. The company was organized at King's River, Madison county, September 3, 1862; enlisted at Elm Springs, Washington county, September 12, 1862.
 Company H, Commanded by Captain B.T. Hailey, formerly Companies C and D, Chew's Sharpshooter Battalion, Perkins' and Hailey's dismounted cavalry companies. These companies had also previously served in Major Gipson's Battalion of Mounted Rifles. Captain Hailey's company was dismounted on August 24, 1862, and Captain Perkin's company was dismounted no September 16, 1862. After being dismounted the companies were assigned to Chew's Sharpshooter Battalion and participate in the battle of Prairie Grove with that unit and suffered ten killed and wounded. 
 Company I, Commanded by Captain Martin V. Cook, formerly Company B, 
 Company K, Commanded by Captain Jacob C. Mules, organized by Captain Wiley Tomlinson (KIA Prairie Grove) as Tomlinson's Cavalry at Waldron, Scott county, July 4, 1862; enlisted at Big Creek, Sebastian county, July 20, 1862; The Company was assigned to Maj Gipson's Battalion of Mounted Rifles, before being dismounted and assigned as Company B, Chew's Sharpshooter Battalion.

Battle of Helena
Fagan's Brigade spent the winter of 1863–64 in camp near Little Rock, remaining there until June when the unit began the movements that would lead to the Battle of Helena. During the attack on Union forces at Helena, Arkansas, on July 4, 1863, Fagan's Brigade was assigned to Sterling Price's Division of Theophilus H. Holmes's army. Fagan's 1,300 men were assigned to capture Hindman's Hill southwest of the city, but they were ultimately unsuccessful. Amidst confusing and vague orders to "attack at daylight" from Holmes, Fagan and Price failed to coordinate their attacks. Price interpreted this order to mean an attack at sunrise and Fagan interpreted it to mean an attack at first light. The result was that Fagan was surprised to find his attack on Hindman Hill was opposed by artillery fire from Graveyard Hill, which was Price's objective. General Fagan had expected Price to be engaged already with that battery. Fagan's artillery had not been able to reach the battlefield because of felled trees blocking the road. Fagan had no artillery available to silence the Federal guns and had no choice but to order his troops to try to take the hill while under artillery fire. Fagan's men reached the summit of the hill and managed to seize the outer fortifications but were pinned down just short of the summit by the two Union batteries. The exposed Confederates were targeted by every remaining gun on the battlefield as well as the heavy guns of the USS Tyler. By 10:30 Holmes realized that his position had deteriorated and that he could make no further headway. The attack on the Union base had failed, and a general retreat was ordered. The regiment reported 137 casualties during the Battle of Helena, including 17 killed, 52 wounded and 67 missing. Major Cocke was among the wounded. In his report, Colonel Hawthorn stated that Captain Walton Watkins, Co. D, was killed. "Here also the much-beloved Capt. Walton Watkins, while most gallantly leading his company over the enemy's works, fell. It has never been my lot to witness more gallantry and more determined courage than displayed by this young officer on that day. We mourn the loss of other brave and true officers who fell during the engagement." However, Captain Watkins' compiled service record states that he was wounded and captured and sent to Overton Hospital at Memphis; then transferred to Johnson's Island Military Prison on August 6, 1863; and forwarded to New Orleans for exchange on January 9, 1865.

Little Rock Campaign
The 39th (Hawthorn's) Regiment Arkansas Infantry Regiment, with Fagan's Brigade participated in the defense of Little Rock on September 10–11.  The Union advance upon Little Rock was opposed mainly by the Confederate cavalry divisions of Generals Marmaduke and Walker. The Confederate infantry brigades were dug in on the north side of the Arkansas River. According to Captain Ethan Allen Pinnell of the 8th Missouri Infantry Regiment,

The Union forces established a pontoon bridge near Bayou Fourche, and crossed to the south side of the very low Arkansas River. With his works on the north side of the river now flanked, Price was forced to abandon the city on September 10, after a brief engagement at Bayou Fourche. Price's Army withdrew in the direction of Rockport.  Colonel Alexander T. Hawthorn took command of the brigade in the fall of 1863 and Colonel John Cocke took command of the regiment. The regiment spent the winter of 1863–1864 in Camden, Arkansas.

Red River Campaign
In the Spring of 1864, the regiment was assigned to Brig. Gen. Hawthorn's Brigade, of Major-General Churchill's Arkansas Division Red River Campaign. In early in March and early April 1864, Churchill's Division marched south to oppose Union Major-General Nathaniel P. Banks during the Red River Campaign of north-central Louisiana  defeating him at the Battle of Pleasant Hill on April 10, 1864. Hawthorn's Brigade was initially left behind at Camden, Arkansas, when the rest of the army went to join Lieutenant-General Dick Taylor. They were eventually called upon as well, and left Camden for Louisiana on April 5. It reached Shreveport around April 14 or 15 when they got news about the Confederate victories at Mansfield and Pleasant Hill. On the 16th, they started their march back to Arkansas with the rest of the army.

Battle of Jenkins' Ferry
Churchill's Division marched back north into Arkansas to deal with the other part of the Federal advance, Major-General Frederick Steele's Camden Expedition. The division arrived after a long forced march at Woodlawn, Arkansas, on April 26, where they rested overnight, then joined the pursuit of Steele's retreating army, catching it trying to cross the Saline River near Jenkins' Ferry. Colonel John B. Cocke was killed in action during the battle of the same name. Lieutenant-Colonel Cadwallader Polk assumed command of the regiment after Cocke's death.

Close of the war
On September 30, 1864, the 39th (Cocke's) Regiment Arkansas Infantry Regiment was assigned to 4th (Hawthorn's) Brigade, 1st (Churchill's) Division, Second (Magruder's) Corps, Army of the Trans-Mississippi, and remained in that assignment through December 31, 1864. On November 17, 1864, a union spy reported that Hawthorn's Brigade and Churchill's Division was in the vicinity of Camden, in Ouachita County, Arkansas. On December 31, 1864, General E. Kirby Smith's report on the organization of his forces lists the 34th Arkansas, under the command of Colonel Brooks as belonging to 4th (Hawthorn's) Brigade, 1st (Churchill's) Division, Second (Magruder's) Corps, Army of the Trans-Mississippi.

Hawthorn's Brigade was ordered to move to Dooley's Bluff, near Washington, in Hempstead County on January 19, 1865, in order to assist with the building of fortifications along the Red River. On January 22, 1865, Major-General Churchill was ordered to move his division to Minden, Louisiana, and occupy winter quarters. On January 23, 1865, Churchill sent a dispatch to Colonel Hawthorn at Dooley's Ferry and directed his movement to Minden, Louisiana.

Union commanders in the Department of the Gulf reported on March 20, 1865, that General Hawthorn's brigade was composed of four regiments and was located a Minden, Louisiana, with the rest of Churchill's Division. In early April 1865, the division concentrated near Shreveport, Louisiana, and then moved to Marshall, Texas, by mid April 1865.

Engagements
The regiment participated in the following American Civil War engagements:

 Battle of Prairie Grove
 Battle of Helena
 Little Rock Campaign
 Red River Campaign
 Camden Expedition
 Battle of Jenkins' Ferry

Surrender and parole
The Regiment was surrendered, along with the rest of the Trans-Mississippi Department, on May 26, 1865, by Lieutenant-General Simon B. Buckner.  With very few exceptions, the Arkansas Infantry regiments in the Trans-Mississippi simply disbanded without formally surrendering. When the Trans-Mississippi Department surrendered, all of the Arkansas infantry regiments were encamped in and around Marshall, Texas (war-ravaged Arkansas no longer able to subsist the army). The regiments were ordered to report to Shreveport, Louisiana, to be paroled but none of them did so. Some individual soldiers went to Shreveport on their own to be paroled, others reported to Union garrisons at Fort Smith, Pine Bluff, or Little Rock to receive their paroles, but for the most part, the men simply went home.

See also 
 List of Arkansas Civil War Confederate units

Notes

References

Bibliography

 Shea, William L. Fields of Blood: The Prairie Grove Campaign. Chapel Hill: University of North Carolina Press, 2009. 
 Hess. Earl J.; Shea, William L.; Piston, William G.; Hatcher, Richard W.: Wilson's Creek, Pea Ridge, and Prairie Grove: A Battlefield Guide, with a Section on Wire Road,  Lincoln, Nebraska, U.S.A. Bison Books 2006, 
 Bears, Edwin C. "The Battle of Helena, July 4, 1863." Arkansas Historical Quarterly 20 (Autumn 1961): 256–297.
 Christ, Mark K. Civil War Arkansas, 1863: The Battle for a State. Norman: University of Oklahoma Press, 2010.
 Christ, Mark K., ed. Rugged and Sublime: The Civil War in Arkansas. Fayetteville: University of Arkansas Press, 1994.
 Christ, Mark K. "'We Were Badly Whipped': A Confederate Account of the Battle of Helena, July 4, 1863." Arkansas Historical Quarterly 69 (Spring 2010): 44–53.
 Schieffler, George David. "Too Little, Too Late to Save Vicksburg: The Battle of Helena, Arkansas, July 4, 1863." MA thesis, University of Arkansas, 2005

External links

 39th Arkansas Infantry Regiment at Edward G. Gerdes Civil War Home Page
 39th Arkansas Infantry Regiment at Encyclopedia of Arkansas
 39th Arkansas Infantry Regiment at the U.S. National Park Service

 
1862 establishments in Arkansas
1865 disestablishments in Texas
Units and formations of the Confederate States Army from Arkansas
Military units and formations established in 1862
Military units and formations disestablished in 1865
Trans-Mississippi Department